Gryllus is a genus of field cricket (Orthoptera, Gryllidae, Gryllinae). Members of the genus are typically 15–31 mm long and darkly coloured.  The type species is Gryllus campestris L.: the European field cricket.

History 
Until the mid-1950s, native field crickets in eastern North America were all assigned to a single species, Acheta assimilis Fabricius. Although regional variation in calling song and life history were noted, no morphological characters could be found to reliably distinguish these variants. Building upon the pioneering work of Fulton, Alexander  used male calling song, life history and crosses between putative species to revise the taxonomy of gryllines in the eastern United States, and recognized five species, although at the time they were still classified in the genus Acheta.

Description 
Species in this genus often look extremally similar to species from other genera. They can often only be distinguished by the male genitalia. The epithallus typically consists of three lobes, the middle one being longer and more slender than the rest, in American and European species. African species, however, show more variability, making it more difficult to assign species to a genus with the same degree of certainty as there is more overlap with closely related genera.

Distribution 
Gryllus is one of the most widespread cricket genera. It is found in Africa, North and South America, Europe and Asia.

Species
The genus contains the following species as of March 2023:

Gryllus abditus Otte & Peck, 1997
Gryllus abingdoni Otte & Peck, 1997
Gryllus abnormis Chopard, 1970
Gryllus alogus Rehn, 1902 – damp-loving field cricket
Gryllus amarensis  (Chopard, 1921)
Gryllus ambulator Saussure, 1877
Gryllus argenteus  (Chopard, 1954)
Gryllus argentinus Saussure, 1874
Gryllus armatus Scudder, 1902
Gryllus assimilis  (Fabricius, 1775) – Jamaican field cricket
Gryllus ater Walker, 1869
Gryllus barretti Rehn, 1901
Gryllus bellicosus Otte & Cade 1984
Gryllus bicolor Saussure, 1874
Gryllus bimaculatus De Geer, 1773
Gryllus braueri  (Karny, 1910)
Gryllus brevecaudatus  (Chopard, 1961) – short-tailed field cricket
Gryllus brevicaudus Weissman, Rentz, Alexander & Loher 1980
Gryllus bryanti Morse, 1905
Gryllus campestris Linnaeus, 1758
Gryllus capitatus Saussure, 1874
Gryllus carvalhoi  (Chopard, 1961)
Gryllus cayensis Walker, 2001 – Keys wood cricket
Gryllus chaldeus  (Uvarov 1922)
Gryllus chappuisi  (Chopard, 1938)
Gryllus chichimecus Saussure, 1897
Gryllus cohni Weissman, Rentz, Alexander & Loher 1980
Gryllus comptus Walker, 1869
Gryllus conradti  (Bolivar, 1910)
Gryllus darwini Otte & Peck 1997
Gryllus debilis Walker, 1871
Gryllus firmus Scudder, 1902 – sand field cricket
Gryllus fultoni  (Alexander, 1957) – southern wood cricket
Gryllus fulvipennis Blanchard, 1854
Gryllus galapageius Scudder, 1893
Gryllus genovesa Otte & Peck 1997
Gryllus insularis Scudder, 1876
Gryllus integer Scudder, 1901 – western trilling cricket
Gryllus isabella Otte & Peck 1997
Gryllus jallae Giglio-Tos, 1907
Gryllus kapushi Otte, 1987
Gryllus krugeri Otte, Toms & Cade 1988
Gryllus lineaticeps Stål, 1861 – variable field cricket
Gryllus luctuosus  (Bolivar, 1910)
Gryllus madagascarensis Walker, 1869
Gryllus marchena Otte & Peck 1997
Gryllus maunus Otte, Toms & Cade 1988
Gryllus maximus  (Uvarov 1952)
Gryllus meruensis Sjöstedt, 1909
Gryllus miopteryx Saussure, 1877
Gryllus multipulsator Weissman 2009 – Long-chirp Field Cricket
Gryllus mzimba Otte, 1987
Gryllus namibius Otte & Cade 1984
Gryllus nigrohirsutus Alexander, 1991
Gryllus nyasa Otte & Cade 1984
Gryllus opacus Chopard, 1927
Gryllus ovisopis Walker, 1974 – taciturn wood cricket
Gryllus parilis Walker, 1869
Gryllus pennsylvanicus Burmeister, 1838 – fall field cricket
Gryllus personatus Uhler, 1864 –  Badlands cricket
Gryllus peruviensis Saussure, 1874
Gryllus pinta Otte & Peck 1997
Gryllus quadrimaculatus Saussure, 1877
Gryllus rhinoceros Gorochov, 2001
Gryllus rixator Otte & Cade 1984
Gryllus rubens Scudder, 1902 – eastern trilling cricket
Gryllus scudderianus Saussure, 1874
Gryllus signatus Walker, 1869
Gryllus spinulosus Johannson, 1763
Gryllus subpubescens  (Chopard, 1934)
Gryllus texensis Cade & Otte 2000 – Texas trilling cricket
Gryllus urfaensis Gumussuyu, 1978
Gryllus veletis  (Alexander & Bigelow 1960) – spring field cricket
Gryllus vernalis Blatchley, 1920 – northern wood cricket
Gryllus vicarius Walker, 1869
Gryllus vocalis Scudder, 1901 – vocal field cricket
Gryllus zaisi Otte, Toms & Cade 1988
Gryllus zambezi  (Saussure, 1877)

References

External links
 
 

 
Orthoptera genera
Taxa named by Carl Linnaeus
Orthoptera of Asia
Orthoptera of Africa
Orthoptera of Europe
Orthoptera of North America
Orthoptera of South America